The Snake River is a river in Renfrew County, Ontario, Canada.

Course
The river begins at Lake Doré in North Algona-Wilberforce township. It flows east under Ontario Highway 41, then south past the community of Lake Dore. It then turns east, takes in the right tributary Mink Creek, travels through the Upper Osceola Marsh, and reaches the community of Osceola in Admaston–Bromley township. It heads north through the Snake River Marsh, a proposed Provincial Conservation Reserve site, then flows east through the community of Snake River in Whitewater Region township, under Ontario Highway 17, and reaches its mouth at Muskrat Lake on the Muskrat River, a tributary of the Ottawa River.

Tributaries
Mink Creek (right)

See also
List of rivers of Ontario

References

Rivers of Renfrew County